Lily May Humphreys (born 14 March 2002) is an English professional golfer and Ladies European Tour player. She won the 2017 Girls Amateur Championship and the 2023 Joburg Ladies Open.

Amateur career
Humphreys had a successful amateur career. She won the Fairhaven Trophy in 2016 and the Girls Amateur Championship, English Women's Amateur Championship, and the Junior Orange Bowl International in 2017. In 2018 she won the Helen Holm Scottish Women's Open Championship and in 2019 she won the Irish Women's Open Stroke Play Championship and the Welsh Ladies Open Stroke Play Championship back to back. The following year she was runner-up in the English Women's Amateur Championship and finished third in the English Women's Open Amateur Stroke Play Championship.

Humphreys was a member of the 2018 Great Britain and Ireland Curtis Cup Team and she represented Europe in the 2019 Junior Solheim Cup. She representing Great Britain & Ireland at the 2017 Junior Vagliano Trophy and 2019 Vagliano Trophy, and played in the 2018 Summer Youth Olympics.

She made her major debut at the 2020 U.S. Women's Open thanks to being number 17 in the Women's World Amateur Golf Ranking.

Professional career
Humphreys turned professional at the start of June 2021, at 19 years old, having had to postpone it a year due to the COVID-19 pandemic as the LPGA and LET Q-schools were cancelled.

After two starts on the Ladies European Tour she sealed her maiden professional win in just her third professional start and first on the LET Access Series, securing a six-shot victory at the Golf Flanders LETAS Trophy. She continued to win the 2021 LETAS Order of Merit, securing a Ladies European Tour card for 2022.

In August 2021, Humphreys played four weeks in a row on the Nordic Golf Tour in Sweden as part of the LETAS' Nordic Swing, finishing second in the last three of the events, which earned her the 2021 season Order of Merit win.

In March 2023, Humphreys began the final day six shots behind overnight leader Moa Folke at the Joburg Ladies Open, but fired a final round of 67 (–6) to secure a two-shot victory and her maiden LET title.

Amateur wins
2016 Fairhaven Trophy
2017 Girls Amateur Championship, The Comboy Leveret, Sir Henry Cooper Junior Masters, English Women's Amateur Championship, Junior Orange Bowl International, European Young Masters (individual champion)
2018 Helen Holm Scottish Women's Open Championship
2019 Annika Invitational Europe, Irish Women's Open Stroke Play Championship, Welsh Ladies Open Stroke Play Championship

Source:

Professional wins (2)

Ladies European Tour wins (1)

^Co-sanctioned by the Sunshine Ladies Tour

LET Access Series wins (1)

Team appearances
Amateur
European Young Masters: (representing England): 2017
Junior Vagliano Trophy: (representing Great Britain & Ireland): 2017
Curtis Cup (representing Great Britain & Ireland): 2018
Summer Youth Olympics (representing Great Britain): 2018
European Girls' Team Championship (representing England): 2016, 2017
European Ladies' Team Championship (representing England): 2018, 2019
Vagliano Trophy: (representing Great Britain & Ireland): 2019
Junior Solheim Cup (representing Europe): 2019
Astor Trophy (representing Great Britain and Ireland): 2019

Source:

References

External links

English female golfers
Ladies European Tour golfers
Golfers at the 2018 Summer Youth Olympics
Sportspeople from Chelmsford
2002 births
Living people